Thomas Ernest Bailey (born 21 April 1991) is an English cricketer who plays for Lancashire. He made his first-class debut in 2012 and is a right-handed batsman who bowls right arm fast medium. On 29 August 2020, in the 2020 t20 Blast fixture against Leicestershire, Bailey took his first five-wicket haul in a T20 match.

References

External links
 

1991 births
Living people
Cricketers from Preston, Lancashire
English cricketers
English cricketers of the 21st century
Lancashire cricketers